Pseudeustrotia indeterminata is a species of cutworm or dart moth in the family Noctuidae. It was described by William Barnes and James Halliday McDunnough in 1918 and is found in North America.

The MONA or Hodges number for Pseudeustrotia indeterminata is 9054.

References

 Lafontaine, J. Donald & Schmidt, B. Christian (2010). "Annotated check list of the Noctuoidea (Insecta, Lepidoptera) of North America north of Mexico". ZooKeys, vol. 40, 1-239.

Further reading

 Arnett, Ross H. (2000). American Insects: A Handbook of the Insects of America North of Mexico. CRC Press.

External links

 Butterflies and Moths of North America

Noctuinae
Moths described in 1918
Moths of North America
Taxa named by William Barnes (entomologist)
Taxa named by James Halliday McDunnough